Sarduri II (ruled: 764–735 BC) was a King of Urartu, succeeding his father Argishti I to the throne.  The Urartian Kingdom was at its peak during his reign, campaigning successfully against several neighbouring powers, including Assyria.

Reign 

The succession from Sarduri II is not entirely clear. There's also attested a king Sarduri III, so Rusa may also have been his son.

Sarduri II notably expanded Urartian territory by conquering the northern region of Colchis, as well as Melid and Kummuh in the  Euphrates valley. Urartian sources refer to campaigns of Sarduri II against a place called "Babilu", which has sometimes been identified with Kassite regions that were formerly part of Babylonian Empire

In 743 BC, at a battle located somewhere in Kummuh, the Assyrians, under Tiglath-pileser III, defeated Sarduri and his anti-Assyrian coalition, forcing the Urartians back across the Euphrates.

Sarduri II was so confident in his power that he erected a massive wall at Tushpa (modern-day Van) with the following inscription:
"the magnificent king, the mighty king, king of the universe, king of the land of Nairi, a king having none equal to him, a shepherd to be wondered at, fearing no battle, a king who humbled those who would not submit to his authority."

He may also have been succeeded by his son, Rusa I. There are various theories about this, but the matter is still disputed because of the lack of solid evidence.

Early campaigns
The following are two passages from Sarduri II's inscriptions found at Van by Armenian archeologist Joseph Orbeli in 1912: 
Claims of conquests such as this appear repeatedly:

See also

 List of kings of Urartu

References

M. Chahin (2001) "The Kingdom of Armenia", Chapter 8: ""Sarduri II (753-735 BC): The Golden Age of Vannic power

Urartian kings
8th-century BC rulers